Professor (Dr.) G.S. Bajpai is an Indian professor and the incumbent Vice-Chancellor of National Law University Delhi. He was the former Registrar of the National Law University Delhi from September 2014 - May 2021. He was subsequently appointed as the  Vice-Chancellor of Rajiv Gandhi National University of Law and served in the position till February 2023.

Career
The author, researcher and administrator, Prof G S Bajpai serves as Professor of Criminology & Criminal Justice; Chair Professor at K.L Arora Chair in Criminal Law at National Law University, Delhi and also as the Chairperson at the Centre for Criminology & Victimology.  He is also the Registrar, National Law University, Delhi.  Before this, he was serving (2007–2011) as Professor & Chairperson at the Centre for Criminal Justice Administration, National Law Institute University, Bhopal (MP). He also had positions at the  Indian Institute of Public Administration, (1989) Bureau of Police Research and Development, (1989– 1995) Punjab Police Academy, Punjab and Department of Criminology & Forensic Science, University of Saugar, M.P. He did his post-doctorate study (2004) as Commonwealth Fellow at the Department of Criminology, Leicester University, U.K.

Books

External links 
 NLU Delhi

References

Living people
Indian criminologists
Indian male writers
Indian social sciences writers
Year of birth missing (living people)